Crap Grisch (also known as Planggenhorn) is a mountain of the Lepontine Alps, situated between Vals and Safien in the canton of Graubünden in Switzerland.

References

External links
 Crap Grisch on Hikr

Mountains of the Alps
Mountains of Switzerland
Mountains of Graubünden
Lepontine Alps
Two-thousanders of Switzerland
Safiental
Vals, Switzerland